"Candidatus Bartonella eldjazairii" is a candidatus bacteria from the genus of Bartonella.

References

 

Bartonellaceae
Candidatus taxa